Fusinus cretellai is a species of sea snail, a marine gastropod mollusc in the family Fasciolariidae, the spindle snails, the tulip snails and their allies.

Description
The length of the shell attains 27.8 mm.

Distribution
This marine species occurs off Tanger

References

 Hadorn, R. & Rolàn, E., 1999. Two new Fusinus (Gastropoda: Fasciolariidae) from northwest Africa and the Canary Islands, including a brief description of the type material of Fusinus crassus (Pallary, 1901). Argonauta 13(1): 39-47

External links
 Pallary, P. (1901-1902). Diagnoses de quelques coquilles nouvelles provenant du Maroc. Journal de Conchyliologie. 49: 226-228, 314-315

cretellai
Gastropods described in 2008